Det är det pojkar gör när kärleken dör is a studio album by Martin Stenmarck, released on 7 November 2007.

Track listing
 "Rubb och stubb" – 3:05
 "100 år från nu (Blundar)" – 3:51
 "Det ska vara fest den dagen jag dör" – 4:19
 "Liten man på jorden" – 3:49
 "Psalm nr 2" – 5:01
 "Det är det pojkar gör när kärleken dör" – 3:29
 "Ful" – 4:24
 "Dagen D" – 3:46
 "Den långa vägen hem (4 km-sången)" – 4:14
 "100 år från nu (Blundar)" (Bassflow Remix) – 3:34
 "Som en sten" – 4:11

Charts

References

2007 albums
Martin Stenmarck albums
Swedish-language albums